Regius Professorship of Physiology is a Regius Chair at the University of Aberdeen. It was originally called the Regius Chair of the Institutes of Medicine.

List of Regius Professors of Physiology

 1877 to 1886: William Stirling
 1886 to 1928: John Alexander MacWilliam
 1928 to 1935: John Macleod
 Cecil Kidd
 1977 to 1983: Derek Ogston 
 2002 to present: Colin McCaig

References

Physiology Aberdeen
Professorships at the University of Aberdeen